Hugh O'Neill (born July 16, 1954) is a retired American soccer player who played professionally in the North American Soccer League, Scottish First Division, American Soccer League and Major Indoor Soccer League.

Early life
Born and raised in Kearny, New Jersey, O'Neill graduated from Essex Catholic High School before playing soccer at the Scots Club, and the University of Bridgeport where he was a 1973 and 1975 All American soccer player.

Playing career

Club
In 1975, O'Neill turned professional with the Hartford Bicentennials of the North American Soccer League.

The following fall, the Bicentennials sent him on loan to Glasgow Rangers F.C. of the Scottish League.  The Bicentennials failed to perceive that O'Neill's Roman Catholic faith and his family history of supporting Celtic could present a problem.  Despite this, O'Neill played every reserve game that season, except for the games against the Celtic reserves.  The Bicentennials became the Connecticut Bicentennials for the 1977 season.  The Bicentennials sent him to the Dallas Tornado during the season.

In 1978, he became the first player signed by the Memphis Rogues.  He later played for the Carolina Lightnin' of the American Soccer League.  In September 1981, he scored the game-winning goal as the Lightnin' took the ASL championship.  He continued with the Lightnin' in 1982, but lost part of the season when he returned to New Jersey to be with his dying father.  He played the 1980 indoor season with the Cleveland Force of the Major Indoor Soccer League.

International
O'Neill played for the 1976 U.S. Olympic Soccer team during its qualification campaign for the Olympic tournament.

References

External links
NASL stats

1954 births
Living people
American soccer players
American expatriate soccer players
Essex Catholic High School alumni
People from Kearny, New Jersey
Soccer players from New Jersey
Sportspeople from Hudson County, New Jersey
American Soccer League (1933–1983) players
Connecticut Bicentennials players
Rangers F.C. players
Dallas Tornado players
Memphis Rogues players
Carolina Lightnin' players
Cleveland Force (original MISL) players
North American Soccer League (1968–1984) players
Major Indoor Soccer League (1978–1992) players
Association football midfielders
Association football forwards